The Munich Fanny Mendelssohn String Quartet, Renate Eggebrecht 1st violin, Mario Korunic 2nd violin, Stefan Berg viola, Friedemann Kupsa violoncello, was founded in 1989 in the occasion of the performance and publication of Fanny Mendelssohn-Hensel's String Quartet in E-flat major and Piano Quartet in A-flat major at the Gasteig/Munich.

The String Quartet plays music by women composers including many first performances such as works of Violeta Dinescu, Gloria Coates, Fukuo Yamagushi, Renate Birnstein and Mayako Kubo (Reinbert Evers, guitar).

The quartet recorded the chamber music of Fanny Mendelssohn Hensel (Stefan Mickisch, piano) and Ethel Smyth as CD world premiere recordings. They presented the CD world premieres of the String Quartets of Elisabeth Lutyens. Gloria Coates and Violeta Dinescu and also CD recordings of the String Quartets of Grazyna Bacewicz, Germane Tailleferre, Arthur Bliss and Darius Milhaud (with Ulrike Sonntag, soprano). In 1997 the ensemble recorded the great piano chamber music of  Max Reger, his Piano Quintet c minor and his two Piano Quartets (Wolfram Lorenzen, piano).

The Fanny Mendelssohn Quartet debuted at the Schleswig-Holstein Musikfestival with the interpretation of the String Quartet E minor of Ethel Smyth and the Piano Quartet of Fanny Mendelssohn-Hensel (Céline Dutilly, piano). The musicians performed the chamber music of  Fanny Mendelssohn-Hensel at the Chard Music Festival, England, for the first time.

CD recordings
 Fanny Mendelssohn, String Quartet E flat major (1834), Piano Quartet A flat major (1822) (world premiere recordings)
 Ethel Smyth, String Quintet E major op.1, String Quartet E minor (1912) (world premiere recordings)
 Germaine Tailleferre, String Quartet (1919) 
 Grażyna Bacewicz, String Quartets N° 4 (1950), N° 6 (world premiere recording) (1960), N° 7 (1965)
 Elisabeth Lutyens, String Quartet N° 6 op. 25, Violeta Dinescu, String Quartet Terra Lonhdana (1984), Gloria Coates, String Quartet N° 3 (1975) (world premiere recordings)
 Darius Milhaud, String Quartets N° 1 op. 5, N° 2 op.16, N° 3 op. 32 with soprano (world premiere recording), N° 4 op. 46, N° 5 op. 64, N° 6 op. 77, N° 7 op. 87, N° 8 op. 121, Machines agricoles op. 56, Catalogue de Fleurs op.60 (world premiere recording)
 Arthur Bliss, String Quartet N° 1 B flat major (1941), String Quartet N° 2, F minor (1950)
 Max Reger, Piano Quintet C minor op. 64, Piano Quartet D minor op. 113, Piano Quartet A minor op. 133

Members
 Renate Eggebrecht, violin
 Mario Korunič, violin
 Stefan Berg, viola
 Friedemann Kupsa, violoncello

External links 
 

German string quartets
Musical groups established in 1989